Distant Voices, Still Lives is a 1988 British period drama film written and directed by Terence Davies. It evokes working-class family life in Liverpool during the 1940s and early 1950s, paying particular attention to the role of popular music, Hollywood cinema, light entertainment and the public house within this tight-knit community.

The film is made up of two separate films, shot two years apart, but with the same cast and crew. The first section, 'Distant Voices', chronicles the early life of a working-class Catholic family living under a thoroughly psychotic, abusive, violent and mostly hateful father. The second section, 'Still Lives', sees the children grown up and emerging into a brighter 1950s Britain, only a few years from rock and roll and The Beatles, yet somehow still a lifetime away.

The film won the Grand Prix of the Belgian Film Critics Association. In 2007 the British Film Institute re-printed and distributed the film across some of Britain's most high-profile independent cinemas, prompting The Guardian newspaper to describe Distant Voices, Still Lives as "Britain's forgotten cinematic masterpiece".

In a 2011 poll carried out by Time Out of the 100 greatest British films of all time, Distant Voices, Still Lives was ranked third.

Location
In Paul Farley's British Film Institute Modern Classics book on Distant Voices, Still Lives, Terence Davies describes how they chose the location for filming:

Kensington Street, Liverpool, L7 8XD
This small street of Victorian terraced houses to the north of Kensington was the childhood home to Terence Davies and his family. The Victorian houses in Kensington Street were demolished in 1961 and replaced at a later date by a low-rise Council estate and two industrial units. However, houses very similar to those in Kensington Street remain to the south of Kensington in streets such as Albany Road, L7 8RG and Saxony Road, L7 8RU.

47 Whistler Street, London, N5 1NJ
The central location for the filming of Distant Voices, Still Lives was chosen for its architectural similarity to Davies's childhood home in Kensington Street, Liverpool. 47 Whistler Street is a small terraced house in row of similar Victorian houses located in north London on the edge of Highbury Fields. The street can be accessed from the park via a small alleyway, or from Drayton Park, the main road behind the street. The houses on the west side of Whistler Street are bay-fronted and were chosen to depict the actual family home. The houses on the east side are flat-fronted and therefore rarely shown in the film sequences. However, a house on the eastern side of the street is used in the final scene where the group leave Tony's wedding celebration and walk into the darkness.

The Futurist, Lime Street, Liverpool
The Futurist was the location which inspired the film's (arguably) most artistic sequence in which the two sisters, Eileen and Maisie, attend a screening of Love is a Many Splendored Thing whilst unknown to them, their brother and Maisie's husband, George, have a serious accident. The Futurist was Liverpool's first purpose-built and longest-surviving cinema, opening in 1912. It was an ornate city centre cinema with a tiled Edwardian facade and 1,029 seats in the stalls and circle auditorium - the latter richly decorated with plasterwork in the French Renaissance style. The cinema lasted nearly 70 years and closed its doors for the final time in 1982, before being demolished in 2016.

Jubilee Drive, Liverpool, L7 8SL
This Victorian street in the Kensington Fields area of east Liverpool was the street where Monica (Micky) lived and begged Eileen to come and visit. "So don't be a stranger – otherwise we'll not see you till next Preston Guild. We're only in Jubilee Drive."

Formby Sands
Monica, Jingles and Eileen pitch their tent at Formby sands – a scene which is used to remind Eileen of the free and happy life she lived before her marriage to Dave.

Pwllheli
Although more famous in later years for the Butlins holiday parks, in the 1940s this Welsh seaside town was an upmarket location with high-quality hotels. Teenagers from Liverpool and Manchester would work in these hotels in the summer season. In the film, Eileen, Monica and Jingles are seen working as waitresses in the breakfast hall of an (unnamed) large hotel.

Autobiographical references
In his British Film Institute Modern Classics book, Paul Farley describes the inspiration that Terence Davies used for the biographical backbone of the film:

Davies was the youngest of ten children, the baby boomer, born into a working-class Catholic household in post-war Liverpool. His father died when he was six-and-a-half, though memories of him as a powerful, domineering, violent man are vivid and, together with the love and support of his mother, form a huge tension in Distant Voices, Still Lives

Terence Davies's real-life father can be seen in a photograph which hangs on the wall in one of the film's central sequences when the mother and her three children, Tony, Eileen and Maisie, each walk out of the frame to reveal a tired and bleached photograph of their father.

Songs
Music is central to Distant Voices, Still Lives and is a device which binds the characters and helps to give them a voice beyond their otherwise repressed lives. In Paul Farley's BFI book, Terence Davies describes the process in which music came alive in the shooting of the film.

Many of the songs were sung by the cast, including Debi Jones's light rendition of "Buttons and Bows" and Angela Walsh's emotional rendition of Johnny Mercer's "I Wanna Be Around". The film also features a juxtaposition of Ella Fitzgerald singing "Taking a Chance on Love" and a scene of brutal domestic violence. Musical arrangements were by Robert Lockhart

"There's a Man Goin' Round Takin' Names" - Jessye Norman
"I Get the Blues When it Rains" - Marcy Klauber
"Oh, Mein Papa" - Eddie Calvert
"Roll out the Barrel" (Beer Barrel Polka) - Jaromír Vejvoda
"A Hymn to the Virgin" - Benjamin Britten
Pastoral Symphony No.3 - Vaughan Williams
"Love is a Many Splendored Thing" - Mantovani arr. Robert Lockhart
"Up the Lazy River" - Hoagy Carmichael
"Galway Bay" - Tommy Riley
"Taking a Chance on Love" - Ella Fitzgerald
"Finger of Suspicion" - Dickie Valentine
"My Yiddishe Momma" - popularised by Anne Shelton
"Brown Skin Girl" - King Radio
"Back in the Old Routine" - Wilson Stone
"I Love the Ladies" (Traditional)
"Buttons and Bows" - Jay Livingston, Ray Evans
"If You Knew Suzie" - Joseph Meyer & Stephen W. Ballantine, George Buddy De Sylva
"I Wanna Be Around" - Johnny Mercer – sung in the 1950s by Julie London
"O Waly, Waly" - Peter Pears

The melody "Limelight" is also used in the film's soundtrack, played on the harmonica; this is the main theme from the Charlie Chaplin film of the same name. Also heard in instrumental form is "The Isle of Innisfree" by Dick Farrelly.

Alcohol
Many of the film's most illuminating sequences were filmed in public houses. In one scene Tony orders a round of drinks from the bar and lists a number of drinks that would have been staple drinks in 1940s and 1950s Liverpool, but are barely heard of now. These include 'Mackies', 'Black and Tan', a 'Pale Ale and Lime' and a 'Rum and Pep' (Rum and Peppermint).

Cast
Pete Postlethwaite – Father / Tommy Davies
Freda Dowie – Mother / Nell Davies
Lorraine Ashbourne – Maisie Davies
Angela Walsh – Eileen Davies
Dean Williams – Tony Davies
Jean Boht – Aunty Nell
Michael Starke – Dave
Andrew Schofield – Les
Debi Jones – Micky
Chris Darwin – Red
Vincent Maguire – George
Pauline Quirke – Doreen
Toni Mallen – Rose

Crew
Editor – William Diver
Cinematography – William Diver & Patrick Duval
Camera Operator – Harriet Cox

Reception
The film won the Film of the Year awarded by the London Film Critics' Circle and the Grand Prix of the Belgian Film Critics Association. It tied with "Story of Women for the best foreign film award voted by the Los Angeles Film Critics Association.

In a 2011 poll carried out by Time Out of the 100 greatest British films of all time, Distant Voices, Still Lives was ranked third.

The Independent ranked the film at number 6 in its top 20 British films of all time.

The film received 12 votes – 11 from critics, and one from director Carlos Reygadas – in the British Film Institute's 2012 Sight & Sound polls.

As of May 2020, Distant Voices, Still Lives holds a rating of 80% on Rotten Tomatoes from 40 reviews.

Box Office
The film made £480,000 in the UK.

See also
 BFI Top 100 British films

References

External links
 
 
 
 

1988 films
British drama films
Films set in Liverpool
LGBT culture in Liverpool
Films directed by Terence Davies
Golden Leopard winners
1980s English-language films